Jessica Player (born December 27, 1982) is a former American child actress, best known for playing the role of Krystina Carrington, the young daughter of Krystle Carrington (played by series star Linda Evans) and Blake Carrington (played by series star John Forsythe) from 1987 to 1989 in the hit ABC drama series Dynasty. She reprised her role in the 1991 mini-series Dynasty: The Reunion.

Filmography

References

External links

1982 births
Living people
Actresses from Wyoming
American child actresses
American film actresses
American television actresses
People from Cheyenne, Wyoming
20th-century American actresses
21st-century American women